Cyligramma amblyops is a moth of the family Noctuidae. This species of moth is commonly found in the Gold Coast region of Western Africa, now part of Ghana.

References

Catocalinae
Insects of Cameroon
Owlet moths of Africa
Insects of West Africa
Insects of Uganda
Fauna of Zambia